Internet Money Records, often credited as Internet Money, is an American record label and record producer collective. It was founded by American record producer Taz Taylor, who serves as the chief executive officer (CEO). The producer collective consists of Taylor himself, Nick Mira, DT, Alec Wigdahl, Cxdy, E-Trou, JR Hitmaker, KC Supreme, MJ Nichols, Pharaoh Vice, Census, Paryo, Ryder Johnson  and manager Birdman Zoe. The artists that are signed to the label consist of Dro Kenji & Rich Amiri. A blend of a YouTube channel, a record label, and a producer union, Internet Money is a medium for producers to sell beats, as well as an aggregator for producers and creatives. Beyond helping other producers with the business side of making music, Internet Money hosts "tours", where producers can collaborate with each other.

Internet Money has been responsible for multiple songs that have charted on the Billboard Hot 100. Members of the collective have frequently produced for artists such as Lil Tecca, Juice Wrld, Trippie Redd, The Kid Laroi, Lil Tjay and YoungBoy Never Broke Again, among others. On August 28, 2020, Internet Money released their debut album, B4 the Storm, which charted at number 10 on the Billboard 200. The album produced the top-10 single, "Lemonade", a collaboration with Gunna, Don Toliver, and Nav, which charted at number six on the Hot 100. Their beats are widely known for their heavy use of the 808.

History
In 2016, American record producer Taz Taylor started Internet Money Records. Taylor believes that Internet Money is a way to help producers make money off of music using the same techniques he uses. In 2018, Internet Money signed a record deal with Alamo and Interscope Records. During a stint in mid-2019, Taylor's relationship with Alamo and Interscope soured. By late summer, Taylor had agreed to a buyout with Alamo and Interscope and signed a new record deal with TenThousand Projects and Virgin Music, giving him more control of who he could sign to the joint venture. On August 16, 2018, Internet Money was featured alongside American rapper 03 Greedo on fellow American rapper Mozzy's single, "Free Greedo".

On October 11, 2019, Internet Money released a collaboration with American rappers Lil Tecca and A Boogie wit da Hoodie, "Somebody", as the collective's debut single. The song entered at number 96 on the US Billboard Hot 100 and received platinum certification by the Recording Industry Association of America (RIAA). On April 17, 2020, they were featured on Lil Tecca's single, "Out of Love", from the latter's debut studio album, Virgo World. On August 14, 2020, they released a collaboration with American rapper Gunna and American singer Don Toliver, "Lemonade", which features Canadian rapper Nav. The song reached number six on the Hot 100, becoming Internet Money's highest-charting song, and received triple platinum certification by the RIAA. Exactly a week later, they released the promotional single, "Thrusting", which features American rappers Swae Lee and Future. Internet Money released their debut studio album, B4 the Storm, on August 28, 2020. The album debuted and peaked at number 10 on the US Billboard 200 and received gold certification by the RIAA."Somebody" and "Lemonade" served as the respective lead and second singles of the album, while "Thrusting" served as the sole promotional single of it. After the release of the album, "Lemonade" received two remixes. The first remix of the song, which replaces Gunna and Nav with American rapper Roddy Ricch, was released on September 30, 2020. It was added as the only new addition to the complete edition of the album, which was released on October 23, 2020. The second remix of "Lemonade", which is a Latin remix that adds Gunna and Nav back and replaces Roddy Ricch with Puerto Rican rapper Anuel AA, was released on November 20, 2020.  On the same day the latter remix was released, Internet Money released a collaboration with Lil Gnar and Lil Keed, "Hey!".

On March 26, 2021, Internet Money released a collaboration with Lil Tecca and American rapper Lil Mosey, "Jetski", which possibly serves as the lead single of the collective's upcoming second studio album. On April 8, 2021, they were featured alongside American rapper Lil Skies on fellow American rapper Snot's single, "Whipski". On May 13, 2021, they released a collaboration with Don Toliver and American rapper Lil Uzi Vert, "His & Hers", which features Gunna, as the potential second single of their next album. The song debuted and peaked at number 67 on the Billboard Hot 100 and received gold certification by the RIAA. On July 29, 2021, they released a collaboration with Hong Kong singer Jackson Wang, "Drive You Home". On December 10, 2021, they released a collaboration with American rappers Dro Kenji and Scorey, "Finders Keepers". On January 21, 2022, Internet Money released a collaboration with American rapper YoungBoy Never Broke Again, "Flossin'", as the possible third single of their next album, but appeared as the only new track to the deluxe edition to YoungBoy's commercial mixtape, Colors, which was taken down later. The song debuted and peaked at number 72 on the Hot 100.

Artists

Current acts

Discography

Studio albums

Extended plays

Singles

As lead artist

As featured artist

Promotional singles

Other charted songs

Guest appearance

Notes

References

American hip hop record labels
Hip hop collectives
Record labels established in 2016
Trap musicians
Alternative R&B musicians
Emo rap musicians
Pop-rap groups